Ferdinand August Rojahn (1822-1900) was a German-born organist, violinist and conductor. He was violin and piano teacher to the Norwegian composer, violinist and conductor Sigurd Lie (born  1871). Rojahn was a Stadmusikanten in Kristiansand, Norway. He was "orchestra leader" of Musikselskabet Harmonien (which later became the Bergen Philharmonic Orchestra) from 1856 until 1859.

1822 births
1900 deaths
19th-century German musicians
19th-century German male musicians